The 2006 European Wrestling Championships was held from 25 April to 30 April 2006 in Moscow, Russia.

Medal table

Medal summary

Men's Freestyle

Men's Greco-Roman

Women's freestyle

* In women 48 kg the Ukrainian Mariya Stadnik won gold medal, but later she was disqualified because she use Furosemide.

References

External links
 "European Championships - United World Wrestling

Europe
European Wrestling Championships
2006 in European sport
2006 in Russian sport
International wrestling competitions hosted by Russia
April 2006 sports events in Europe
2006 in Moscow
Sports competitions in Moscow